Secom Co., Ltd. (Japanese: セコム株式会社, Sekomu kabushikigaisha) is a Japanese security company headquartered in Tokyo, Japan. It has operations in Japan, United Kingdom, Australia, New Zealand, South Korea, Taiwan, China, Thailand, Vietnam, Malaysia, Singapore, Indonesia, and Myanmar.

History 
The company was founded in 1962 and operated under the name Nippon Keibi Hosho until 1983. It initially offered security services such as patrolling services and static guard services.

In 1966, the company developed Japan’s first on-line security system. In 1983, Nippon Keibi Hosho adapted the name Secom, which was originally used only as a brand name of the company. The Secom name "was coined as a contraction of 'security' and 'communication', the concept of this brand was to build 'a new security system collaborating people and science'”.

References

External links

  
  
 

Business services companies established in 1962
Multinational companies headquartered in Japan
Companies based in Tokyo
Companies listed on the Tokyo Stock Exchange
Companies listed on the Osaka Exchange
Security companies of Japan
Security companies of Singapore
Security companies of the United Kingdom
Fire detection and alarm companies
Robotics companies of Japan
Robotics in Japan
Japanese brands